William Ryan (March 8, 1840February 18, 1925) was an American banker and businessman who served one term as a U.S. Representative from New York from 1893 1895.

Biography
Born in County Tipperary in Ireland (then a part of the U.K.) on March 8, 1840, Ryan immigrated to the United States with his parents, who settled in Stanwich (now Greenwich, Connecticut) in 1844.  He attended the local schools, worked on farms near Greenwich and taught school.  In the spring of 1859, he went to the Rocky Mountains and engaged in prospecting and mining until 1861, when he settled in Port Chester, New York.  Ryan was a successful farmer, merchant and banker.

Political career
A Democrat, he served in local office including school board member.  He was Town Supervisor of Rye from 1883 to 1885.  In 1886, he was appointed Undersheriff of Westchester County and he served until 1889.  He was a member of the New York State Assembly (Westchester Co., 2nd D.) in 1891 and 1892.

Ryan was elected to the 53rd Congress, serving from March 4, 1893, to March 3, 1895.

Later career
Ryan resumed his business interests after leaving Congress, including serving as President of the Port Chester Savings Bank and operating a Florida ranch that produced oranges.  He also served as President of the Village of Port Chester.

Death and burial
Ryan died in Crescent City, Florida on February 18, 1925. He was interred in St. Mary's Cemetery in Greenwich.

References

External links

 

1840 births
1925 deaths
American bank presidents
Irish emigrants to the United States (before 1923)
Democratic Party members of the New York State Assembly
People from Port Chester, New York
People from County Tipperary
Politicians from County Tipperary
Businesspeople from Greenwich, Connecticut
Burials in Connecticut
Democratic Party members of the United States House of Representatives from New York (state)